Ypenburg Airport (Dutch: Vliegveld Ypenburg), which later became Ypenburg Air Base was an airport in the Netherlands in Leidschenveen-Ypenburg near the city of The Hague. The ICAO code was EHYB.

History
The airfield was established in 1936, initially for recreational purposes. At the beginning of World War II German forces attempted to capture the airfield, in 1940, via an airborne landing during the Battle for The Hague. This failed however and Dutch forces recaptured the airfield. After the Netherlands eventually surrendered to Germany, the Luftwaffe made no use of the airfield during the remainder of the war.

After the war the field remained a civilian airport until 1955, when it was turned into an Air Base. After 1968, operations decreased significantly; the Air Base was used mainly as a VIP airport for politicians and the royal family. In 1982 it was decided to close the Air Base, but it was not until 1992 that it was abandoned by the Royal Netherlands Air Force. Among the last aircraft to use the airport were military cargo aircraft heading towards Kuwait during the Gulf War. In 1997 a new residential area was constructed on the site of the airport, Leidschenveen-Ypenburg. Very little remains of the airport today, the former air traffic control tower being a notable exception.

External links

Vliegveld Ypenburg historical website

Defunct airports in the Netherlands
Royal Netherlands Air Force bases
Airports in South Holland
Buildings and structures in Rijswijk
Transport in The Hague
Airports established in 1936
Airports disestablished in 1992